Vitez City Stadium is a multi-use stadium in Vitez, Bosnia and Herzegovina. It is the home ground of Premier League of Bosnia and Herzegovina side Vitez. The stadium has capacity of 3,500 spectators.

Last reconstruction of the stadium was conducted in 2013.

References

Vitez
Football venues in Bosnia and Herzegovina
Multi-purpose stadiums in Bosnia and Herzegovina